is a fictional character from Square Enix's video game franchise Kingdom Hearts. First making a cameo during the final scenes of the 2004 title Kingdom Hearts: Chain of Memories and full appearance in Kingdom Hearts II, Roxas is a "Nobody", who was created from the series' main character Sora who briefly loses his heart during the first game of the series. Kingdom Hearts II reveals that Roxas is a member of Organization XIII, a group of Nobodies who need him as he can wield the Keyblade, a weapon that allows him to capture hearts. As a member of the organization, Roxas bears the title . He is also the protagonist of the video game Kingdom Hearts 358/2 Days, which revolves around his origins. In the Japanese games, Roxas is voiced by Kōki Uchiyama, while Jesse McCartney takes the role in the English versions.

Since his cameo appearance, director Tetsuya Nomura has said that Roxas is an important character in the series, and in order to explain his back story in more detail than was done in Kingdom Hearts II, Kingdom Hearts 358/2 Days was created. Since his introduction in Kingdom Hearts II, Roxas has received positive critical response from video game publications with most of them focusing on his development in 358/2 Days. Various types of merchandise based on his character has been produced.

Creation and development
After Roxas first cameo at the end of Kingdom Hearts: Chain of Memories, the series' director, Tetsuya Nomura, was questioned about the character. However, he refrained from revealing too much detail about him and said he would become an important, playable character for the franchise. The developers wrote Roxas' story in Kingdom Hearts II to add mixed feelings to the game in a short time frame. After receiving a positive fan response to Roxas' sad scenario, Nomura concluded that it was well executed. He also stated that Roxas' merging with Sora in the game was one of the most memorable scenes from the series for him. Nomura later commented that Roxas was one of the first characters created for Organization XIII, and was always intended to be the 13th member. The meaning of Roxas' name was meant to be revealed in a scene in Kingdom Hearts II that shows the letters in the word "Sora" rearranged with the "X" added to expand the connection between the characters. However, this scene was omitted as Nomura found it difficult to implement time-wise. Since his debut in Kingdom Hearts II, Roxas has been voiced in Japanese by Kōki Uchiyama and by Jesse McCartney in the English versions.

After Kingdom Hearts II Final Mix was released, Nomura wanted to expand Roxas' role in the series to explain the events between his birth and his disappearance from Organization XIII. For Kingdom Hearts 358/2 Days, the staff thought that Roxas' role as a member of the group would be a suitable theme for the plot. Roxas was chosen as the game's protagonist as the staff thought that having a main character besides Sora would help to introduce gamers to the series' first Nintendo DS title. Co-director Tomohiro Hasegawa explained that Roxas' was originally shorter, and the staff decided he should grow taller as the game continued to develop. Nomura wanted to portray Roxas' activities differently from Sora's. In Sora's games, he is on a journey around the world, while Roxas always returns to Organization XIII after each mission. The staff constructed Roxas' interactions with the Disney characters differently from Sora's, as the Organization was meant to be secret in the game's story. Nomura told the writers that he wanted Roxas to learn something from each of his missions or just to have something to think about. Nomura later clarified that Roxas' personality was different from the one portrayed in Kingdom Hearts II, as he does not actively attempt to come into contact with other characters. With Kingdom Hearts 358/2 Days, Nomura wanted to reveal why Roxas left Organization XIII. Although Nomura found it a sad story, he considered Zack Fair's ending in Crisis Core: Final Fantasy VII to be more tragic. Nomura felt Roxas' last words in the game were also the title's most significant, as he wanted them to connect to Kingdom Hearts IIs first scene, which is actually the same scene. Uchiyama expressed sadness when the game's development ended as he would not play the character for a long time.

Kingdom Hearts II Final Mixs secret ending features a character named Ventus who bears a strong striking resemblance to him. Nomura commented that, despite their similarities, Roxas and Ventus are not the same character. He also said that when playing Kingdom Hearts Birth by Sleep, players will be able to distinguish Roxas from Ventus. In another interview, Nomura implied both characters are related, specifically to Sora, but he wanted fans to imagine reasons for such a connection. For the game Kingdom Hearts III, there is a possibility of Roxas being revived despite Sora being alive at the same time. Nomura says this will be explained by the fact that the character Xehanort whose Heartless and Nobody, Ansem and Xemnas, exist at the same time as the original one. Originally, Roxas was not meant to return to the game but positive response to his character led to his inclusion.

Characteristics
Roxas is depicted as a spiky blond-haired boy with blue eyes. Due to his nature as a Nobody, he is an "empty shell" of series' protagonist Sora created when the latter sacrifices his heart and becomes a Heartless during the events of Kingdom Hearts. As a result, despite his teenage appearance, Roxas is one day short of a year old when he rejoins Sora in Kingdom Hearts II. As a civilian, he wears a white jacket over a black one and white trousers. As a member of Organization XIII, Roxas wears a hooded black coat that covers most of his body. However, the player can modify it during Kingdom Hearts 358/2 Days using the game's panel system. Roxas also becomes able to dual-wield Keyblades after leaving the Organization, and exclusively uses the weapon's  and  forms for each.

Roxas' personality changes significantly across the series due to the fact that when first introduced, he appears with fake memories that make him believe he is a common teenager, and spends most of his time with his friends. After learning that he is Sora's Nobody, and remembering his past, Roxas gives up his existence so that Sora can continue to exist, but still expresses happiness for his fate. During his time in the Organization, Roxas develops a calm personality as a result of having no memories of a previous life, unlike other Nobodies.

Appearances
Roxas' first appearances were cameos in Another Side, Another Story, a bonus trailer found in Kingdom Hearts, and in the ending of Kingdom Hearts: Chain of Memories. In Kingdom Hearts II, Roxas is introduced as a boy living in a computer simulation of a city called Twilight Town. Unaware of the virtual nature of the city, Roxas begins to dream about the adventures of Sora, the series' protagonist. He later encounters Axel, a member of Organization XIII who is under orders to extract him, and Naminé, a Nobody who tells him he is Sora's other half. Shortly after meeting DiZ, the creator of the virtual world, Roxas learns the true nature of Twilight Town, and that DiZ altered his memory and personality to mislead his pursuers from the Organization until he can merge with Sora. DiZ leads Roxas to an old mansion where he rejoins a sleeping Sora, allowing him to wake up. Sora later learns that Roxas is his Nobody, created during the events of the first game after briefly turning into a Heartless, and inducted into the Organization for his ability to capture hearts with the Keyblade; however, Roxas later betrayed the Organization and encountered one of Sora's friends, Riku, who captured him to restore Sora. Roxas makes two appearances near the end of the game: the first is in a mental battle with Sora depicted as a cut-scene, and the second is with Naminé, who has merged with her other self, Kairi. In the re-released version of the title, Kingdom Hearts II Final Mix, Roxas' fight against Sora is expanded, making him a boss character. The battle was meant to be interactive in Kingdom Hearts II, but time constraints imposed from creating fights for the other Organization XIII members prevented its inclusion. With the opportunity to include the fight, Nomura's team worked hard to make it entertaining for players. Additional scenes about Roxas' past were included in the game to add to the mystery around him.

Kingdom Hearts 358/2 Days, a prequel to Kingdom Hearts II, reveals Roxas' life with Organization XIII. Unlike the other Organization members, he lacks memories of his previous life. During Roxas' time in the Organization, he is placed under Axel's watch, and the two become friends. After Axel is sent to Castle Oblivion, Roxas is partnered with Xion, the Organization's 14th member and another Keyblade wielder, whom he befriends. Roxas reacts to Sora's memory restoration and starts questioning why he uses the Keyblade, doubting the Organization's motives. When he discovers that Xion is a replica created by Xemnas from Sora's memories, Roxas is compelled to defect from Organization XIII to find answers and meet Sora. After doing so, he encounters Xion, who has been repurposed by Xemnas to absorb him so that she can become a complete replica; however, the fight ends with Xion's defeat, and she entrusts Roxas with freeing the hearts captured by the Organization. On his way to face Xemnas, Roxas is confronted by Riku, who knocks him unconscious in order to help DiZ and Naminé wake Sora.

A virtual representation of Roxas appears as a boss character in the mobile phone game Kingdom Hearts Coded, in which he confronts a virtual representation of Sora; he later appears in the ending as one of the people connected to Sora's heart who may have a chance at returning one day. He makes a cameo appearance at the end of Kingdom Hearts Birth by Sleep, where he is shown with Xion and Axel eating sea-salt ice cream in Twilight Town, as well as in Kingdom Hearts 3D: Dream Drop Distance, where Roxas contacts both Axel and Sora through dreams. He also appears in Shiro Amano's manga and Tomoko Kanemaki's novels, where he reprises his role from the video games. The book Kingdom Hearts: Another Report includes a novel called Roxas–Somewhere in Time that retells Roxas' days in the Organization with the exception of his befriending Xion.

In Kingdom Hearts III, as Sora tries to stop the revived Xion from killing Lea, Roxas says her name through Sora, making Xion stop. Roxas is revived by Ienzo, Vexen, and Demyx through Vexen's Replica Program just in time to save Xion from being killed by Xemnas in the Keyblade Graveyard. He fights alongside Sora and Xion in Lea's place to defeat Saïx. Then he joins the other guardians of light in defeating Master Xehanort and closing Kingdom Hearts, after which he and Xion join Lea on the Twilight Town clock tower. They are joined by Isa (formerly Saïx), Hayner, Pence, and Olette, and they all eat ice cream together. Then they're brought to Destiny Islands to celebrate their victory with the others, where Roxas races with Riku and Terra on the beach.

Roxas also makes an appearance in Super Smash Bros. Ultimate as a spirit. In a collaboration between Square Enix and Japanese fashion brand SuperGroupies, Roxas's image was used to create clothing.

Reception
Roxas has been featured in various types of merchandise produced by Square Enix. An action figure was released as part of the Play Arts action figures series; Other items include a plush, keychains and replicas of his necklace.

Roxas' character has received a positive critical response from both fans and video game publications. During February 2010, Roxas was twenty-eighth in a Famitsu poll featuring the most popular video game characters from Japan. In another poll, Roxas was voted the second most popular Kingdom Hearts character with his fight against Sora ranked as the best scene from the series. His fighting sequences from the first game's secret ending were called one of the best video game cinematic moments by GameSpy. 

While reviewing Kingdom Hearts II Jeff Haynes of IGN said that Roxas was a "likable kid". Ron Fahey of Eurogamer had a similar view, calling him a "likeable enough young chap who just happens to be troubled by memories and visions of people he doesn't even know". His playable position in the game was regarded as a transitional arc, being used to introduce the gameplay to players who are new to the franchise. Cavin Smith of PSX Extreme also called Roxas a likable character and stated that the revelation regarding his existence in Kingdom Hearts II is "a shocker of a revelation for any RPG!" The New York Times liked the fact that the player controls Roxas in Kingdom Hearts IIs introduction instead of the protagonist Sora, avoiding the continuation of Sora's search for his friends. Additionally, the reviewer found the switch from Roxas' story to Sora's after a few hours "a little jarring". Andrew Reiner from Game Informer emphasizes his role as a "troubled boy," calling his story arc "an amazing chain of events," particularly noting that the revelation of his nature as a Nobody creates a "devilish yet remarkable plot twist" which may impact the player in a way that he "may not want Sora back". On the other hand, UGO Networks commented that due to the game's initial focus on Roxas, gamers would have to wait until playing as Sora to experience the most exciting parts of the title. Alexa Ray Corriea commented that the first hours of the game were the most boring not only due to the common activities in Twilight Town but also because Roxas lacks the appeal that makes Sora an entertaining character.
 
Before Kingdom Hearts 358/2 Days was released, 1UP.com featured Roxas at the top of their "Why You Should Care About Kingdom Hearts 358/2 Days" feature, calling him "The darling of fanfiction and doujinshi writers everywhere," and commenting on what he does during his only year within Organization XIII. Roxas' role as protagonist was described by G4TV as an attempt to "satiate the ravenous fanboy" due to the explanation from his background. While reviewing 358/2 Days, PALGNs Adam Ghiggino praised Roxas' development saying that even gamers who did not like his character in Kingdom Hearts II would care about him as "he evolves from a self-described 'zombie' to a strong-willed and interesting character". Ghiggino especially noted his relationship with Xion and Axel, which he found charming despite the fact that they repeatedly meet at the top of a clock tower in many scenes. A similar response appeared in Game Informer, which commented that although such scenes were "dull", Roxas' relation with Xion and Axel was appealing and the game's ending would make up for such moments. GamesRadar also commented that Roxas "starts off like a zombie, but rapidly develops a personality" during the title and joked about the numerous times he eats ice cream. His growth during the game was also picked as one of the most enjoyable elements of the title. IGN agreed, calling Roxas' friendship "heart-aching". On the other hand, 1UP.com mentioned that although Roxas' relationship with Xion and Axel is appealing, some of his first missions feel like "lonely, sad affairs". His maneuvers in the game were praised by GameSpot for being easy to learn despite how complex they look, while IGN liked the variation between them.

Due to his resemblance to Ventus, video game publications initially thought that Roxas would be one of the protagonists from Kingdom Hearts Birth by Sleep. However, when it was revealed that the two were different, publications still discussed how similar they were and if there was a connection between them. Bob Muir from Destructoid noted that in Birth by Sleep Ventus was the most important character by fans due to his similarities with Roxas. Den of Geek enjoyed Roxas' return in Kingdom Hearts III.

References

Characters designed by Tetsuya Nomura
Fictional characters who can manipulate light
Fictional explorers in video games
Fictional knights in video games
Kingdom Hearts original characters
Male characters in video games
Square Enix protagonists
Video game bosses
Video game characters introduced in 2004
Video game characters introduced in 2005
Video game characters who can move at superhuman speeds
Video game characters who can teleport
Video game characters who use magic
Fictional members of secret societies
Fictional swordfighters in video games
Fictional characters with air or wind abilities
ja:XIII機関#メンバー